Radio Din Raat is a Bangladeshi FM radio station in Dhaka. It started broadcasting on 2016. The owner of the radio station is Square Group.

References

2016 establishments in Bangladesh
Organisations based in Dhaka
Radio stations in Bangladesh
Mass media in Dhaka